James Howard Mitcham (1917 in Winona, Mississippi – August 22, 1996 in Hyannis, Massachusetts) was an American artist, poet, and cook best known for his books on Louisiana's Creole and Cajun cuisines and that of New England, with an emphasis on seafood.

Deaf from spinal meningitis as a teenager, Mitcham attended Louisiana State University and moved to Greenwich Village where he owned an art gallery. He acquired a reputation as a bohemian, raconteur, and "Renaissance man", spending much of his life in Provincetown, Massachusetts and New Orleans. He contributed a column to the Provincetown Advocate, since absorbed by the Banner.

Many of his books combined personal memoir and recipes with his own woodcuts and drawings. Anthony Bourdain has described Mitcham's Provincetown Seafood Cookbook as "a witty, informative ode to local seafood, sprinkled with anecdotes".

He was the model for the "stone-deaf man" in Marguerite Young Miss MacIntosh, My Darling.

Books
 Fishing on the Gulf Coast, The Hermit Crab Press, New Orleans 1959
 Four Tales from Byzantium, edition of 150 numbered copies printed by Wattle Grove Press, Newnham,Tasmania 1964 
 Provincetown Seafood Cookbook, The Hermit Crab Press, Provincetown 1975, 
 Creole Gumbo and All That Jazz: A New Orleans Seafood Cookbook, Addison-Wesley Publishing Co., Reading,MA 1978, 
 Maya o Maya!: Rambunctious fables of Yucatán, edition of 500 numbered copies printed by The Hermit Crab Press, New Orleans 1981
 Tales from Byzantium, edition of 1000 numbered copies printed by The Hermit Crab Press, New Orleans 1984
 Clams, Mussels, Oysters, Scallops, and Snails: A Cookbook and a Memoir, Parnassus Imprints, Orleans,MA 1990,

See also
 Shrimp Boil
 "Mississippi's Greatest Chef" by Jesse Yancy

References

External links
 Obituary from the New Orleans Times-Picayune, from Rootsweb
 Article in the New York Times including Bourdain's comments

1917 births
1996 deaths
American food writers
Artists from New Orleans
Louisiana State University alumni
Deaf artists
People from Provincetown, Massachusetts
Deaf poets
Writers from New Orleans
20th-century poets
20th-century American non-fiction writers
People from Winona, Mississippi
American deaf people